Vrush is a rural locality (a selo) in Luchekskoye Rural Settlement, Rutulsky District, Republic of Dagestan, Russia. The population was 32 as of 2010.

Geography 
It is located 14 km northwest of Rutul, on the left bank of the Vrushmeri River. Luchek is the nearest rural locality.

Nationalities 
Rutul people live there.

References 

Rural localities in Rutulsky District